The Sardar-e Jangal gas field is an Iranian natural gas field that was discovered in 2012. Located in 700m water depth it began production in 2012 and produces natural gas and condensates. The total proven reserves of the Sardar-e Jangal gas field, as specified by the Iranian Ministry of Petroleum, are around 50 trillion cubic feet (1,430×109m3), however, estimates from the operator later placed reserves at 5 trillion cubic feet, and production is slated to be around 2.45 billion cubic feet/day (70×106m3).

References

Natural gas fields in Iran